D. Kemaparaj Urs (5 February 1917 – 18 May 1982) was an Indian freedom fighter, actor,  director and producer who worked mainly in the Kannada film industry. His movies in 1940s and 1950s created an impact on the audience. Even before Dr. Rajkumar's arrival to the industry, Urs was already an established star. His elder brother D. Devaraj Urs, served as the Chief Minister of Karnataka.

Personal life
Kemparaj Urs was born in Kallahalli, Hunsur taluk in Mysore to Devaraj Urs and Deveerammanni. His elder brother was D. Devaraj Urs. 
Kemparaj was an English literature student. He married his classmate Lalitha and had three daughters.
Urs aspired to be a doctor but inspired by Mahatma Gandhi and joined freedom struggle and jailed even.

Career
Urs met doyen of Kannada theatre Gubbi Veeranna and started playing in theatre plays in Gubbi company. In 1942, as an independent producer, Gubbi Veeranna made his first film Jeevana Nataka under his own banner Gubbi Films, casting Kemparaj Urs as the male lead opposite to Shanta Hublikar and M. V. Rajamma.
Then in 1947, he played the role Kamsa in the film Krishnaleela which was a hit. His biggest success was Raja Vikrama in 1951 which completed 25 weeks in single theatre.
He produced and directed a number of movies in Kannada, Tamil and Telugu.
Urs also chaired the "Karnataka Film Development Board".

Autobiography
Kemparaj Urs has written an autobiography, "Aravattu Varshagalu"(Eng: Sixty years), published in 1979.

Death
Kemparaj Urs died on 18 May 1982, surviving his wife and daughters.

Filmography

References

External links

Male actors in Kannada cinema
1917 births
1982 deaths
Indian actors
20th-century Indian male actors
People from Karnataka
People from Mysore district
Kannada people